Harold "Iron Bear" Collins is a former professional strongman and world champion Powerlifter. Collins is a member of the Tuskarora Nation of Moratoc Indians in North Carolina, and calls himself the "World's Strongest Native American".

Strongman/Powerlifting
Collins competed in the finals of the World's Strongest Man competition twice, finishing 6th in 1993 and 10th in 1997. Collins is a 2 time USPF National Powerlifting champion, and is a 2 time IPF World Championships bench press gold medalist.

Collins holds multiple North Carolina Bench press records, including the North Carolina State Bench press record in the 275 lb. class with 601 lbs. which he pressed 6 times. He also holds the North Carolina State Bench press record in the Superheavyweight Division with a 633 lb. Bench press.

Guinness World Records
Collins has set a total of 6 Guinness world records during his lifetime. His first world record was set in October 1994 by 

In 1999 Collins set his third Guinness world record by pulling a semi-truck and flatbed trailer weighing a combined total of  160 feet in 44 seconds. The event was broadcast nationally in the US on the television show Extra.
In 2001, Collins set a world record by tossing a 32 pound beer keg 21 feet in the air over a wall.

Collins set a fifth Guinness world record in 2001 by restraining 2 Harley Davidson motorcycles for over 20 seconds.

Collins' sixth Guinness world record was set in 2002 by restraining 2 Dodge V8 pickup trucks at 4,500 RPM for 27 seconds.

Personal life
Now retired from strength competitions, Collins raises money for charities like the March of Dimes.

Collins once owned and operated the Powerhouse Gym in Pembroke, North Carolina.

Collins runs his own website, IRON BEAR VISIONS, as well as organizing his own strongman contest, Iron Bear Strength Challenge which he created in 2009.

Personal Records
Squat - 
Bench press - 
Deadlift -

References

American strength athletes
American powerlifters
Living people
American philanthropists
1957 births